Hariss (or Haris)  is a village, in the region of South Lebanon.

Name
According to E. H. Palmer, the name means "guarded".

History
'Here there appear to be no vestiges of ancient constructions, except a circular cistern
cut in the rock. Guérin suggests that it may be the site of the ancient Harosheth.'.
"This identification is strengthened by the fact that the same word which occurs in the name Kir Haroseth, the modern Kerak, exists in the present local dialect in Moab, under the same form, Harith or Haris."

Ottoman era
In the 1596 tax record, it was named as a village, Haris, in the Ottoman nahiya (subdistrict) of Tebnine under the liwa' (district) of Safad, with a population of 102 households and 8 bachelor, all Muslim. The villagers paid a fixed tax rate of 25% on agricultural products, such as wheat, barley, olive trees, vegetable and fruit garden, orchard, goats and beehives, in addition to "occasional revenues" and a press for olive oil or grape syrup; a total of 3,124 akçe.

In 1852, Edward Robinson noted the village on his travels in the region. In 1875, Victor Guérin found the village to contain 200  Metawileh.

In 1881, the PEF's Survey of Western Palestine (SWP) described it: "A village, built of stone, containing about 100 [..] Metawileh, situated on hill-top, with vineyards, figs, and arable cultivation. There is a birket and many cisterns at the village, and a spring near."

Modern era
On 24 July 2006, during the 2006 Lebanon-Israel war, Israeli warplanes killed 12 people in the village, in two different strikes. The first strike killed 4 Hezbollah fighters, while the second strike demolished a house 100 meters away, killing 8 civilians, aged between 16 and 77 years.

In November 2006, Italian UNIFIL soldiers were accused of theft in a military store in this village.

References

Bibliography

External links
Survey of Western Palestine, Map 2:   IAA, Wikimedia commons
 Hariss, Localiban

Populated places in the Israeli security zone 1985–2000
Populated places in Bint Jbeil District
Shia Muslim communities in Lebanon